Emperor Ling of Han (156/157 – 13 May 189), personal name Liu Hong, was the 12th and last powerful emperor of the Eastern Han dynasty. Born the son of a lesser marquis who descended directly from Emperor Zhang (the third Eastern Han emperor), Liu Hong was chosen to be emperor in February 168 around age 12 after the death of his predecessor, Emperor Huan, who had no son to succeed him. He reigned for about 21 years until his death in May 189.

Emperor Ling's reign saw another repetition of corrupt eunuchs dominating the eastern Han central government, as was the case during his predecessor's reign. Zhang Rang, the leader of the eunuch faction (十常侍), managed to dominate the political scene after defeating a faction led by Empress Dowager Dou's father, Dou Wu, and the Confucian scholar-official Chen Fan in October 168. After reaching adulthood, Emperor Ling was not interested in state affairs and preferred to indulge in women and a decadent lifestyle. At the same time, corrupt officials in the Han government levied heavy taxes on the peasants. He exacerbated the situation by introducing a practice of selling political offices for money; this practice severely damaged the Han civil service system and led to widespread corruption. Mounting grievances against the Han government led to the outbreak of the peasant-led Yellow Turban Rebellion in early 184.

Emperor Ling's reign left the Eastern Han dynasty weak and on the verge of collapse. After his death, the Han Empire disintegrated in chaos for the subsequent decades as various regional warlords fought for power and dominance. (See End of the Han dynasty.) The Han dynasty ended in late 220 when Emperor Ling's son, Emperor Xian, abdicated his throne – an event leading to the start of the Three Kingdoms period in China.

Family background and accession to the throne 

Liu Hong was a hereditary marquis – the Marquis of Jiedu Village. In the Han dynasty, a village marquis's marquisate usually comprised only one village or, in rarer cases, two or three villages. He was the third person in his family to hold this title; his father Liu Chang and grandfather Liu Shu were also formerly Marquis of Jiedu Village. His great-grandfather, Liu Kai, Prince Xiao of Hejian, was the sixth son of Emperor Zhang, the third emperor of the Eastern Han dynasty. His mother, Lady Dong, was Liu Chang's formal spouse.

When Emperor Huan died on 25 January 168 without a son to succeed him, his empress, Empress Dou, became empress dowager, and she examined the genealogy of the imperial clan to choose a candidate to be the next emperor. For reasons unknown, her assistant Liu Shu recommended Liu Hong, the Marquis of Jiedu Village. After consulting with her father Dou Wu and the Confucian scholar-official Chen Fan, Empress Dowager Dou installed a 12-year-old Liu Hong on the throne on 17 February 168, and continued ruling on his behalf as regent. The newly enthroned Emperor Ling bestowed posthumous titles on his grandfather, father and grandmother, honouring them as emperors and an empress respectively. His mother, Lady Dong, did not become empress dowager and instead received the title of an Honoured Lady.

Early reign 
Dou Wu and Chen Fan, who became the most important officials in the central government, sought to purge the eunuch faction. Later in 168, they even proposed to exterminate all the powerful eunuchs, a proposal that Empress Dowager Dou rejected. However, word of the plot was leaked, and the eunuchs, after kidnapping the empress dowager and taking the young emperor into custody (after persuading him that it was for his own protection) arrested and executed Chen Fan. Dou Wu resisted but was eventually defeated and forced to commit suicide. The Dou clan was slaughtered. The powerful eunuchs, led by Cao Jie and Wang Fu, became the most powerful individuals in the central government.

After the destruction of the Dou clan, in 169, Emperor Ling promoted his mother to the position of empress dowager, though he continued honouring Empress Dowager Dou, now under house arrest, as empress dowager as well. Members of the Dong clan began to enter government, but did not have substantial influence. Later that year, the eunuchs persuaded Emperor Ling that the "partisans" (i.e., Confucian officials and those who supported them) were plotting against him, and a large number of partisans were arrested and killed; the others had their civil liberties stripped completely, in an event historically known as the second Disaster of Partisan Prohibitions.

Empress Dowager Dou died in 172. Despite suggestions by eunuchs to have her only buried as an imperial consort and not be honoured as Emperor Huan's wife, Emperor Ling had her buried with full honours befitting an empress dowager in Emperor Huan's mausoleum. In the aftermaths of her death, a vandal wrote on the palace gate: "All that is under the heaven is in upheaval. Cao and Wang murdered the empress dowager. The key officials only know how to be officials and had nothing faithful to say."

The angry eunuchs ordered an investigation which led to over 1,000 arrests, but nothing conclusive was found. In that year, the eunuchs also falsely accused Emperor Huan's brother, Liu Kui, the Prince of Bohai, of treason and forced him to commit suicide. The members of his entire household, including his wife, concubines, children, assistants and principality officials, were all rounded up and executed. As the Han government became more corrupt, the people received heavier tax burdens. As Emperor Ling grew older, he not only took no remedial action, but continued to tolerate the eunuchs' corruption for the most part. A major defeat of the Han army by the Xianbei tribes in 177 further drained the imperial treasury.

In 178, Emperor Ling's wife Empress Song, whom he made empress in 171 but did not favour, fell victim to the eunuchs' treachery. Her aunt, Lady Song, was Liu Kui's wife, so the eunuchs were worried that she would seek vengeance on them. Thus, by collaborating with other imperial consorts who wanted to replace the empress, the eunuchs falsely accused Empress Song of using witchcraft to curse Emperor Ling. The emperor believed them and deposed the empress, who was imprisoned and died in despair. Her father, Song Feng, and the rest of her family were exterminated.

Middle reign 
In 178, Emperor Ling introduced the practice of selling political offices for money – a practice which severely damaged the Han civil service system (chajuzhi, Chinese: 察举) and led to widespread corruption. The people who paid for these positions perpetuated corruption upon taking office. That was exactly what Emperor Ling had in mind: he allowed the officials to pay by instalments after taking office if they could not afford the initial amount.

In January 181, Emperor Ling instated Lady He as the new empress and appointed her brother, He Jin, as a key official in his government. (According to legends, she managed to enter Emperor Ling's imperial harem because her family bribed the eunuchs in charge of selecting women for the emperor.) She received the position of empress because she bore Emperor Ling a son, Liu Bian; the emperor had other sons but they died prematurely before Liu Bian's birth.

During these years, Emperor Ling became interested in building imperial gardens so he ordered the commandery and principality officials throughout the Han Empire to pay their tributes to him directly, so he could use the money to finance his construction projects. This, in turn, created pressures on the officials to resort to corrupt practices so they could extract a larger tribute from their jurisdictions for the emperor. In spite of all his flaws, Emperor Ling occasionally heeded good advice from his subjects but was not consistent in doing so. His subjects often found it frustrating to try to convince him on policy issues because he only listened to them when he wanted to.

The Yellow Turban Rebellion 

Sometime before 183, a major Taoist rebel movement had started in Ji Province – the Taiping Sect, led by Zhang Jiao, who claimed he had magical powers to heal the sick. By 183, his teachings and followers had spread to eight of the empire's thirteen provinces – Ji, Qing, Xu, You, Jing, Yang, Yan, and Yu. Several key imperial officials became concerned about Zhang Jiao's hold over his followers, and suggested that the Taiping Sect be disbanded. Emperor Ling did not listen to them.

Zhang Jiao had in fact planned a rebellion. He commissioned 36 military commanders, set up a shadow government, and wrote a declaration: "The blue heaven is dead. The yellow heaven will come into being. The year will be jiazi. The world would be blessed." (Under the traditional Chinese sexagenary cycle calendar method, 184 would be the first year of the cycle, known as jiazi.)  Zhang Jiao had his supporters write jiazi in large characters with white talc everywhere they could – including on the doors of government offices in the imperial capital and other cities. One of Zhang Jiao's followers, Ma Yuanyi, plotted with two eunuchs to start an uprising inside the palace.

Early in 184, this plot was discovered, and Ma Yuanyi was immediately arrested and executed. Emperor Ling ordered that Taiping Sect members be arrested and executed, and Zhang Jiao immediately declared a rebellion. Every member of the rebellion wore a yellow turban or headscarf as their symbol – and therefore the rebellion became known for it. Within a month, Zhang Jiao controlled large areas of territory. Under suggestion by the eunuch Lü Qiang, who was sympathetic to the partisans, Emperor Ling pardoned the partisans to ward off the possibility they would join the Yellow Turbans. (Lü Qiang himself became a victim, however, when the other eunuchs, in retaliation, falsely accused him of wanting to depose the emperor, and he committed suicide later that year.)

Emperor Ling sent out a number of military commanders against the Yellow Turbans, and in these campaigns several of them distinguished themselves –
including Huangfu Song, Cao Cao, Fu Xie, Zhu Jun, Lu Zhi, and Dong Zhuo. A key military development with great implications later was that the Yellow Turbans fought mainly with troops deployed from the battle-tested Liang Province who had been accustomed to suppressing rebellions by the Qiang tribes. In late 184, Zhang Jiao was killed, and while the rest of the Yellow Turbans were not defeated immediately, they gradually dissipated by the following year. Because of the Liang Province forces' contributions to the campaign, they began to be feared and began to look down on troops from all other provinces. During and in the aftermaths of the Yellow Turban Rebellion, many people from other provinces, in order to ward off pillaging by Yellow Turbans or governmental forces, also organised themselves into military groups, and a good number resisted government forces, and even after the Yellow Turbans were defeated, the central government's control of the provinces was no longer what it used to be.

Late reign 
Even after the Yellow Turban Rebellion was suppressed, Emperor Ling did not change his wasteful and corrupt ways. He continued to levy heavy taxes and continued to sell offices. As a result, other agrarian and military rebellions multiplied. In 185, when a fire broke out in the southern part of the imperial palace, the Ten Attendants suggested to Emperor Ling to levy a tax of ten maces from every mu of farmland to raise funds for rebuilding the palace. Emperor Ling then ordered the officials in Taiyuan, Hedong and Didao commanderies to transport wood and patterned rocks to Luoyang (the imperial capital) as construction materials. When the shipments reached the palace, the eunuchs who received them scolded the labourers for delivering materials of poor quality, and insisted on paying them far below market prices – to as low as a tenth of the market price. They then resold the materials to other eunuchs, who refused to buy. Over time, the accumulated piles of wood started decaying. The construction works were thus delayed for years. In order to please Emperor Ling, some regional officials levied heavier taxes and forced the people to produce greater quantities of construction materials – this led to greater resentment from the common people.

Emperor Ling appointed cavalry officers to serve as his messengers whenever he issued orders for things to be delivered to Luoyang. These officers, known as zhongshi (中使; "central emissaries"), abused their power by forcing the regional officials, who were afraid of them, to give them bribes. The appointment of officials below the position of Inspector was decided by the amount of money they could pay to fund the army and palace construction. Before assuming office, these officials had to undergo an assessment to determine their "value". Some who could not afford the required amount committed suicide, while others who refused to take up their appointments were forced into accepting.

Around the time, there was one Sima Zhi, who had been newly appointed as the Administrator of Julu Commandery. As he had a reputation for being an honest official, he was required to pay less – three million maces. Upon receiving the order, he lamented, "I should be like a parent to the common people, but I have been forced to exploit them to satisfy (the Emperor's) needs. I can't bear to do this." He attempted to resign, claiming that he was ill, but his request was denied. When he reached Meng Ford near Luoyang, he wrote a memorial to point out all the problems with the government and cite historical examples to warn the emperor. He then committed suicide by consuming poison. After reading Sima Zhi's memorial, Emperor Ling temporarily stopped collecting funds for rebuilding the palace, but quickly resumed his construction projects later. He built a hall within the western gardens and filled it with treasures and silk taken from the agriculture department. He also visited his birthplace in Hejian Commandery, where he acquired land and used it to build mansions and towers. As Emperor Ling came from a relatively poor background as a lesser marquis, he had a strong desire to accumulate as much personal wealth as possible – especially after he saw that his predecessor, Emperor Huan, did not leave behind a large family fortune for him. He drew his wealth not just from the imperial treasuries, but also from the low-ranking eunuchs who attended to him.

Emperor Ling often said, "Regular Attendant Zhang (Rang) is my father, Regular Attendant Zhao (Zhong) is my mother." As the eunuchs were highly trusted and favoured by Emperor Ling, they behaved lawlessly and abused their power. They even built lavish mansions for themselves in the same design as the imperial palace. When Emperor Ling once visited Yong'anhou Platform, a high viewing platform, the eunuchs were worried that he would see their mansions and become suspicious. Thus, they told him, "Your Majesty shouldn't put yourself on higher ground. If you do so, the people will scatter." The emperor believed them and stopped visiting high towers and viewing platforms.

In 186, Emperor Ling tasked the eunuchs Song Dian and Bi Lan with overseeing new construction projects, including a new palace hall, four large bronze statues, four giant bronze bells and water-spouting animal sculptures, among others. He also ordered coins to be minted and widely circulated. Many people perceived this to be a display of the emperor's extravagance, and pointed to signs showing that the coins will eventually scatter everywhere. This turned out to be true when chaos broke out in Luoyang after Emperor Ling's death. Emperor Ling appointed Zhao Zhong as "General of Chariots of Cavalry" but removed him from office after some 100 days.

In 188, under the suggestions of Liu Yan, Emperor Ling greatly increased the political and military power of the provincial governors and selected key officials to serve as provincial governors.

In 189, as Emperor Ling became critically ill, a succession issue came into being. Emperor Ling had two surviving sons – Liu Bian, the son of Empress He, and Liu Xie, the son of Consort Wang. Because Emperor Ling had, earlier in his life, frequently lost sons in childhood, he later believed that his sons needed to be raised outside the palace by foster parents. Therefore, when Liu Bian was born, he was entrusted to Shi Zimiao, a Taoist, and referred to "Marquis Shi." Later, when Liu Xie was born, he was raised by Emperor Ling's mother, Empress Dowager Dong, and was known as "Marquis Dong." Liu Bian was born of the empress and was older, but Emperor Ling viewed his behaviour as being insufficiently solemn and therefore considered making Liu Xie crown prince, but hesitated and could not decide.

When Emperor Ling died later that year, a powerful eunuch whom he trusted, Jian Shuo, wanted to first kill Empress He's brother, General-in-Chief He Jin, and then make Liu Xie emperor, and therefore set up a trap at a meeting he was to have with He Jin. He Jin found out, and peremptorily declared Liu Bian emperor.

Family
Consorts and Issue:
 Empress Song, of the Song clan (d. 178)
 Empress Lingsi, of the He clan (d. 189)
 Liu Bian, Prince Huai of Hongnong (176–190), first son
 Empress Linghuai, of the Wang clan (d. 181), personal name Rong
 Liu Xie, Emperor Xiaoxian (181–234), second son
 Unknown
 Princess Wannian, first daughter

Ancestry

See also 
 Consort kin
 Chinese emperors family tree (early)#Han dynasty, Xin dynasty and Shu Han
 Lists of people of the Three Kingdoms

Footnotes

References

 Fan, Ye (5th century). Book of the Later Han (Houhanshu).
 Sima, Guang (1084). Zizhi Tongjian.

156 births
189 deaths
2nd-century births
2nd-century deaths
Eastern Han dynasty emperors
Imperials during the end of the Han dynasty
Child monarchs from Asia
2nd-century Chinese monarchs
People from Baoding
Han dynasty poets
Poets from Hebei